Paraguachón is a corregimiento and community located  east of Maicao, the municipality in which it is located. It is located in the La Guajira Department, in northern Colombia. It is a town that is located on the margin of the border with Venezuela and is where the Transversal del Caribe ends.

References

Geography of La Guajira Department
Corregimientos of Colombia
Colombia–Venezuela border